Sealey is a variation of the English and Anglo-Irish surname Sealy.

Notable persons with the name include:

 Alan Sealey (1942–1996), English footballer
 Ben Sealey (1899–1963), Barbadian cricketer
 John Sealey (born 1945), English footballer
 Les Sealey (1957–2001), English footballer
 Marger Sealey, Venezuelan singer-songwriter and actress
 Nicole Sealey (born 1979), American poet
 Raphael Sealey (1927–2013), American historian of Ancient Greece

See also
 Sealy (disambiguation)
 Seely
 Seeley (disambiguation)